John Murdoch (25 September 1885 – 7 November 1939) was a Canadian athlete. He competed in the men's hammer throw at the 1924 Summer Olympics.

References

External links
 

1885 births
1939 deaths
Sportspeople from Aberdeenshire
British emigrants to Canada
Athletes (track and field) at the 1924 Summer Olympics
Canadian male hammer throwers
Olympic track and field athletes of Canada